Thomas Emmett Hendricks, III (born October 23, 1978) is a former American football player.  He played college football as a defensive back for the University of Michigan from 1996 to 1999 and was a member of the undefeated 1997 Michigan Wolverines football team that was ranked #1 in the final AP Poll.  He later played professional football as a backup linebacker and special teams player in the National Football League (NFL) for the Miami Dolphins from 2000 to 2003 and the Jacksonville Jaguars during the 2004 season.

Early years
Hendricks was born in Houston, Texas, in 1978.  He attended Scarborough High School and Eisenhower High School, both in Houston.  He became known as one of the best high school defensive backs in the country while playing for Eisenhower.

University of Michigan
Hendricks' father, Thomas Hendricks, Jr., played college football as a halfback at the University of Michigan from 1953 to 1955.  Hendricks committed to Michigan in February 1996. He enrolled in the fall of 1996 and played college football as a defensive back for head coach Lloyd Carr's Michigan Wolverines football teams from 1996 to 1999.  As a sophomore, Hendricks started all 12 games at free safety for the undefeated 1997 Michigan Wolverines football team that outscored opponents 322–144, won the Big Ten Conference championship, defeated Washington State in the 1998 Rose Bowl, and was ranked #1 in the final AP Poll.

Hendricks also started all 13 games at free safety for Michigan during the 1998 season, and completed a 37-game streak by starting all 12 games at strong safety for the 1999 Michigan team. He was selected by the conference coaches as a first-team defensive back on the 1999 All-Big Ten Conference football team.

In four years at Michigan, Hendricks started 37 games and registered 222 tackles, 12 pass breakups and three interceptions.

Professional football
Hendricks was undrafted in the 2000 NFL Draft.  He signed as a free agent with the Miami Dolphins where he was converted to a linebacker but cut before the start of the 2000 season. One month after being cut, Miami linebacker Zach Thomas was injured, and Hendricks was re-signed. He was released again a week after being re-signed, joined the Dolphins' developmental squad, and was eventually promoted to the 53-man roster later in 2000.  He appeared in eight games in 2000, mostly on special teams.

In his second season with the Dolphins, Hendricks switched from weakside linebacker to middle linebacker. He appeared in all 16 games and got his first start at linebacker following another injury to Zach Thomas.  He remained with the Dolphins through the 2003 season, appearing in 56 games, three of them as a starter. He was the team's top backup linebacker and a special teams player. He led the team in special teams tackles in 2001 with 30, 2002 with 26 and 2003. He also served as the team's special teams captain for three seasons from 2001 to 2003.

Hendricks played for the Jacksonville Jaguars during the 2004 season, appearing in 15 games. He started one game at linebacker for the Jaguars.

Later Years
Tommy Hendricks now resides in Houston, TX and is now a music producer that has released instrumental albums under the name Hendricks Beats.

References 

1978 births
American football linebackers
Jacksonville Jaguars players
Living people
Miami Dolphins players
Michigan Wolverines football players